Chris Morris (born September 13, 1968) is a former professional Canadian football offensive lineman and current head coach for the University of Alberta's football team, the Alberta Golden Bears. As a professional player, he played for fourteen seasons in the Canadian Football League for the Edmonton Eskimos.  He  was a part of three Grey Cup championship teams with the Eskimos. Morris played CIAU football at the University of Toronto.

External links
 http://www.ac-fpeh.com/alumni/halloffame_bio.php?id=178

1968 births
Living people
Alberta Golden Bears football coaches
Canadian football offensive linemen
Edmonton Elks players
Players of Canadian football from Ontario
Sportspeople from Scarborough, Toronto
Canadian football people from Toronto
Toronto Varsity Blues football players